Myrsine petiolata, the swamp colicwood, is a species of plant in the family Primulaceae. It is endemic to the island of Kauai in Hawaii. It is threatened by habitat loss.

References

petiolata
Trees of Hawaii
Endemic flora of Hawaii
Taxonomy articles created by Polbot

Critically endangered flora of the United States